Lonnie Rush Jr. (born August 11, 1966) is an American professional stock car racing driver. He has raced in the NASCAR Busch Series and the NASCAR Craftsman Truck Series.

Personal life
Rush graduated at Ohio State University in 1989. The university sponsored him in a few NASCAR Truck Series races.

Motorsports career results

NASCAR
(key) (Bold – Pole position awarded by qualifying time. Italics – Pole position earned by points standings or practice time. * – Most laps led.)

Busch Series

Craftsman Truck Series

Busch North Series

References

External links
 
 Lonnie Rush, Jr. archive at The Third Turn
 Lonnie Rush, Jr. at Driver Database

1966 births
NASCAR drivers
CARS Tour drivers
Living people
People from Pickerington, Ohio
Racing drivers from Columbus, Ohio
Racing drivers from Ohio